The Latvian Supercup is a one-match annual football competition. The two participating clubs are holders of the Latvian Higher League champions title and the Latvian Football Cup.  The fixture is played before the start of the season.

The first at so far only Supercup game was held in 2013, when Daugava defeated Skonto at Celtnieks Stadium in Daugavpils. SInce 2014, the competition has been suspended.

In June 2020, the Latvian Football Federation said it plans to revive the competition, naming it after the late coach Jānis Skredelis, either in the summer of 2020 or 2021.

Winners

See also
 Football in Latvia
 Latvia national football team
 Latvian Higher League
 Latvian Football Cup

References

External links
 Latvian Football Federation
Association "Latvian Football Higher League" 

 
2
Defunct national association football supercups
Defunct football competitions in Latvia